Kallidromo is a mountain in southeastern Phthiotis and northeastern Phocis, in Central Greece. Its maximum elevation is 1,399 m. The Kallidromo lies south of the Malian Gulf, east of Mount Oeta and north of the Cephissus valley. The strategic site of  Thermopylae lies north of the mountain. The village of Drymaia is on the mountain. Nearby places are Mendenitsa to the northeast and Amfikleia to the south. The Motorway 1 (Athens - Lamia - Thessaloniki) passes north of the mountain. The classic railway from Athens to Lamia and Thessaloniki passes south and west of the mountain, while the newer high-speed line passes through the mountain via a tunnel.

References

External links

Landforms of Phthiotis
Mountains of Central Greece
Landforms of Phocis